was a Japanese samurai from Chikugo Province who lived during the late Tokugawa shogunate. He sided with Satsuma in the Battle of Toba–Fushimi. After the Meiji Restoration, Shinohara became a businessman and later, a devout Christian. In his memoir, Shinohara describes pivotal events and circumstances surrounding the Shinsengumi, Aburakōji Incident and his own assassination attempt on Kondō Isami.

1828 births
1911 deaths
Japanese businesspeople
Japanese Christians
Shinsengumi
Samurai